Hartshead is a village in Kirklees, West Yorkshire, England,  west of Dewsbury and near to Hartshead Moor.

The village has pre-Norman Conquest origins; the Walton Cross is believed to be dated from the 11th century.

The name Hartshead is derived from Herteshevet or Herteshede which is Scandinavian in origin and means Hill of Heort, Heort meaning Hart in modern English.

Patrick Brontë met his wife, Maria Branwell (they met in Rawdon, some dozen or so miles away from Hartshead) in 1811, when he was parson of Church of St Peter in Hartshead. They were married in Guiseley and became the parents of Anne, Branwell, Charlotte and Emily Brontë.

Kirklees Hall is between Hartshead and the nearby village of Clifton.

Robin Hood is reputed to have been buried near Hartshead or in the grounds of the nearby Kirklees Hall. The exact place is not known, as the gravestone has been moved at least 3 times.

See also
Listed buildings in Liversedge and Gomersal

References

External links

 
Villages in West Yorkshire
Geography of Kirklees